Cookeconcha is a genus of small air-breathing land snails, terrestrial pulmonate gastropod mollusks in the family Endodontidae.

Species
Species within the genus Cookeconcha include:
 † Cookeconcha antiquus Solem, 1977 
 Cookeconcha contorta Solem, 1976
 Cookeconcha contortus (Férussac, 1824)
 Cookeconcha cookei (Cockerell, 1933)
 Cookeconcha decussatulus (Pease, 1866)
 Cookeconcha elisae (Ancey, 1889)
 Cookeconcha henshawi (Ancey, 1904)
 Cookeconcha hystricellus (L. Pfeiffer, 1859)
 Cookeconcha hystrix (L. Pfeiffer, 1846)
 Cookeconcha jugosus (Mighels, 1845)
 Cookeconcha lanaiensis (Sykes, 1896)
 Cookeconcha luctiferus (Pilsbry & Vanatta, 1905)
 Cookeconcha nudus (Ancey, 1899)
 Cookeconcha paucicostata (Pease, 1871)
 Cookeconcha paucilamellatus (Ancey, 1904)
 Cookeconcha ringens (Sykes, 1896)
 Cookeconcha stellulus (Gould, 1844)
 † Cookeconcha subpacificus (Ladd, 1958) 
 Cookeconcha thaanumi (Pilsbry & Vanatta, 1905)
 Cookeconcha thwingi (Ancey, 1904)

References

 Bank, R. A. (2017). Classification of the Recent terrestrial Gastropoda of the World. Last update: July 16th, 2017

External links

 Solem, A. (1976). Endodontoid land snails from Pacific Islands (Mollusca: Pulmonata: Sigmurethra). Part I, Family Endodontidae. Fieldiana. Zoology. 508 pp. Chicago
 Nomenclator Zoologicus info

Endodontidae
Taxonomy articles created by Polbot